Born to Dance is an American musical film starring Eleanor Powell and James Stewart, directed by Roy Del Ruth and released in 1936 by Metro-Goldwyn-Mayer. The score was composed by Cole Porter.

Plot summary

While on leave, sailor Ted Barker (played by James Stewart) meets Nora Paige (Eleanor Powell) at the Lonely Hearts Club, which is owned by Jenny Saks (Una Merkel), the wife of fellow sailor Gunny Saks (Sid Silvers).  Ted instantly falls in love with Nora.

Ted later meets Broadway star Lucy James (Virginia Bruce) aboard a submarine while she's on a publicity tour. Her Pekingese falls overboard, Ted rescues it, and Lucy falls in love with him.  Though Ted has already scheduled a date with Nora, he is ordered by his captain, Dingby (Raymond Walburn), to meet Lucy in a nightclub.

Nora, who lives with Jenny and her daughter, Sally (Juanita Quigley), aspires to become a Broadway dancer.  However, her newfound career is in serious jeopardy when she inadvertently comes between Lucy and her boss McKay (Alan Dinehart). Nora distances herself from Ted after seeing pictures of him and Lucy in a newspaper the next morning.

Lucy convinces McKay to stop the press campaign, threatening to leave the Broadway production if any more photos or articles about her and Ted are published. Nora becomes Lucy's understudy and thinks about her behavior towards Ted.  Nora gets fired suddenly after McKay tells her to perform a dance that Lucy considers undanceable. But Ted knows exactly what to do after he's told the whole story.

Cast
 Eleanor Powell as Nora Paige
 James Stewart as Ted Barker
 Virginia Bruce as Lucy James
 Una Merkel as Jenny Saks
 Sid Silvers as "Gunny" Sacks
 Frances Langford as "Peppy" Turner
 Raymond Walburn as Captain Dingby
 Alan Dinehart as McKay
 Buddy Ebsen as "Mush" Tracy
 Juanita Quigley as Sally Saks
 Georges and Jalna Toregas as themselves
 Reginald Gardiner as Conducting Central Park Policeman
 Barnett Parker as Floorwalker
 Marjorie Lane as Nora Paige (singing voice)
 J. Marshall Smith, L. Dwight Snyder, Ray Johnson, Del Porter as The Foursome

Soundtrack
Unless otherwise noted, Information is taken from IMDb's soundtrack section for this movie.
 Rolling Home (1936)
 Music and Lyrics by Cole Porter
 Sung by The Foursome, Sid Silvers, Buddy Ebsen, James Stewart and male chorus
 Rap, Tap on Wood (1936) (Also called "Rap-Tap on Wood")
 Music and Lyrics by Cole Porter
 Danced by Eleanor Powell and The Foursome
 Sung by Marjorie Lane and The Foursome
 Also danced by Eleanor Powell at a rehearsal
 Hey, Babe, Hey (1936)
 Music and Lyrics by Cole Porter
 Danced by Eleanor Powell, James Stewart, Sid Silvers, Buddy Ebsen, Una Merkel, Frances Langford and The Foursome
 Sung by Marjorie Lane, James Stewart, Sid Silvers, Buddy Ebsen, Una Merkel, Frances Langford and The Foursome
 Hummed by Una Merkel
 Played also as background music
 Entrance of Lucy James (1936)
 Music and Lyrics by Cole Porter
 Sung by Raymond Walburn, Virginia Bruce, The Foursome, and male chorus
 Love Me, Love My Pekinese (1936)
 Music and Lyrics by Cole Porter
 Sung by Virginia Bruce and male chorus
 Danced by Eleanor Powell
 Easy to Love (1936)
 Music and Lyrics by Cole Porter
 Played during the opening credits and as background music
 Sung by Marjorie Lane and James Stewart, Frances Langford, danced by her and Buddy Ebsen
 Eleanor Powell - visual performance
Mock conducted by Reginald Gardiner as the Central Park Policeman, who spoofs conductor Leopold Stokowski, incorporating his long hair and dramatic gestures
 Reprised by the cast at the end
 I've Got You Under My Skin (1936)
 Music and Lyrics by Cole Porter
 Danced by Georges and Jalna
 Sung by Virginia Bruce
 Played also as background music
 Swingin' the Jinx Away (1936); (Also called "Swinging the Jinx Away")
 Music and Lyrics by Cole Porter
 Played during the opening credits
 Sung by Frances Langford, Buddy Ebsen, The Foursome and male chorus
 Danced by Buddy Ebsen and Eleanor Powell
 Sidewalks of New York (1894)
 Music by Charles Lawlor
 Lyrics by James W. Blake
 In the score during the "Rolling Home" number
 Columbia, the Gem of the Ocean (1843)
 Written by David T. Shaw
 Arranged by Thomas A. Beckett
 In the score during the "Rolling Home" number; Also in the score during the "Swingin' the Jinx Away" number and partially sung by the chorus
 The Prisoner's Song (If I Had the Wings of an Angel) (1924)
 Music and Lyrics by Guy Massey
 In the underscore when 'Gunny' Saks is shown in the brig

Production
The film's working title was This Time It's Love.

The film stars dancer Eleanor Powell and was a follow-up to her successful debut in Broadway Melody of 1936. The film co-stars James Stewart as Powell's love interest and Virginia Bruce as the film's resident femme fatale and Powell's rival. Powell's Broadway Melody co-stars Buddy Ebsen and Frances Langford return to provide comedy and musical support. Highlights of the film include a rare musical number by Stewart (which the actor later poked fun at in the That's Entertainment! retrospective), and a bombastic finale called "Swingin' the Jinx Away". Set amidst a pre-Second World War naval backdrop, the Depression-era "feel good" number (which runs nearly 10 minutes) makes topical references to the economy and political leaders (with a "shout out" to Cab Calloway thrown in for good measure) sung by Powell, adds in an eccentric dance routine by Ebsen, and ends in a flurry of tap dancing by Powell culminating in a patriotic salute, and finally a blast of cannon fire. This finale was also lifted in its entirety and re-used in another Powell film, I Dood It, co-starring Red Skelton. Although considered one of Powell's (and MGM's) most memorable musical numbers, and often featured in retrospectives such as That's Entertainment!, musical director Roger Edens was often quoted as being embarrassed by the segment.

In 1936, a part was written for Judy Garland. Cole Porter wrote in his diary that It was his "great Joy" that he was writing for a film featuring Garland. However, her part was written out of the film before she could begin any work on the film

The film introduced the Porter standards "You'd Be So Easy to Love" (performed by Stewart and Marjorie Lane, dubbed for Powell) and "I've Got You Under My Skin" (performed by Bruce), which was nominated for the Academy Award for Best Original Song. It was the first film in which Stewart sang.

Some of the musical numbers were recorded in stereophonic sound, making this one of the first films to utilize multi-channel technology. Rhino Records included the stereo tracks in its soundtrack album, released on CD, including Jimmy Stewart's and Marjorie Lane's performance of "You'd Be So Easy to Love."

Accolades
The film was nominated for two Academy Awards; Cole Porter was nominated for Best Song for "I've Got You Under My Skin," and Dave Gould was nominated for Best Dance Direction.

The film is recognized by American Film Institute in these lists:
 2004: AFI's 100 Years...100 Songs:	
 "I've Got You Under My Skin" – Nominated

References

Green, Stanley (1999) Hollywood Musicals Year by Year (2nd ed.), pub. Hal Leonard Corporation  page 63

External links
 
 
 
 

1936 films
1936 musical films
American musical films
American black-and-white films
1930s English-language films
Films directed by Roy Del Ruth
Films set in New York City
Films scored by Cole Porter
Metro-Goldwyn-Mayer films
1930s American films